Walter Simpson Dickey (1862 - January 22, 1931) was a newspaper publisher, politician, and industrialist in Kansas City, Missouri.

Biography
Dickey was born in Toronto in 1862 and moved to Kansas City in 1885.

In 1889, he established the W.S. Dickey Clay Manufacturing Company which started out creating ceramic pipes made of "burnt clay" that were used to drain farmland via tile drainage.  As municipalities developed underground sewage infrastructures, the company supplied clay pipes to serve that purpose. By 1915, the company was promoting its "tight as a jug" vitrified salt-glazed clay silos. The company had large plants in Pittsburg, Kansas and Deepwater, Missouri and made a fortune providing pipes for buried conduit lines of Bell Telephone.

He was chairman of the Missouri Republican Party and was to help engineer the victory of Herbert S. Hadley, the first Republican governor of Missouri since Reconstruction.

He owned the Kansas City Missouri River Navigation Company for river barges between Kansas City and St. Louis, Missouri until selling the entire fleet to the United States Army during World War I.

In 1916, he ran for United States Senate as a Republican, but was narrowly defeated by incumbent James A. Reed.

In the 1920s he purchased the Kansas City Post and Kansas City Journal combining them into the Kansas City Journal-Post.

He died at his home in the Rockhill neighborhood of Kansas City, Missouri on January 22, 1931.

Legacy
His home was purchased by William Volker and donated to be the first building at the University of Kansas City which would become the University of Missouri - Kansas City.  It is now called Scofield Hall.

References

External links
 Kansas City Public Library biography
 Kansas City Public Library blog

1862 births
1927 deaths
American publishers (people)
People from Old Toronto
State political party chairs of Missouri
Canadian emigrants to the United States